Bisphosphoglycerate mutase (BPGM) is an enzyme expressed in erythrocytes and placental cells.  It is responsible for the catalytic synthesis of 2,3-Bisphosphoglycerate (2,3-BPG) from 1,3-bisphosphoglycerate.  BPGM also has a mutase and a phosphatase function, but these are much less active, in contrast to its glycolytic cousin, phosphoglycerate mutase (PGM), which favors these two functions, but can also catalyze the synthesis of 2,3-BPG to a lesser extent.

Tissue distribution 

Because the main function of bisphosphoglycerate mutase is the synthesis of 2,3-BPG, this enzyme is found only in erythrocytes and placental cells.  In glycolysis, converting 1,3-BPG to 2,3-BPG would be very inefficient, as it just adds another unnecessary step.  Since the main role of 2,3-BPG is to shift the equilibrium of hemoglobin toward the deoxy-state, its production is really only useful in the cells which contain hemoglobin- erythrocytes and placental cells.

Function 

1,3-BPG is formed as an intermediate in glycolysis.  BPGM then takes this and converts it to 2,3-BPG, which serves an important function in oxygen transport.  2,3-BPG binds with high affinity to Hemoglobin, causing a conformational change that results in the release of oxygen.  Local tissues can then pick up the free oxygen.  This is also important in the placenta, where fetal and maternal blood come within such close proximity.  With the placenta producing 2,3-BPG, a large amount of oxygen is released from nearby maternal hemoglobin, which can then dissociate and bind with fetal hemoglobin, which has a much lower affinity for 2,3-BPG.

Structure

Overall 

BPGM is a dimer composed of two identical protein subunits, each with its own active site.  Each subunit consists six β-strands, β A-F, and ten α-helices, α 1-10.  Dimerization occurs along the faces of β C and α 3 of both monomers.  BPGM is roughly 50% identical to its PGM counterpart, with the main active-site residues conserved in nearly all PGMs and BPGMs.

Important residues 
 His11:  the nucleophile of the 1,2-BPG to 1,3-BPG reaction.  Rotates back and forth with the help of His-188 to get in an in-line position in order to attack the 1’ phosphate group.
 His-188:  involved in overall stability of protein, as well as hydrogen bonding to substrate, as His-11, which it pulls into its catalytic position.
 Arg90:  although not involved directly in binding, this positively charged residue is essential to overall stability of the protein.  Can be substituted with Lysine with little effect on catalysis.
 Cys23:  has little effect on overall structure, but large effect on reactivity of the enzyme.

Mechanism of catalysis 

1,3-BPG binds to the active site, which causes a conformational change, in which the cleft around the active site closes in on the substrate, securely locking it in place.  1,3-BPG forms a large number of hydrogen bonds to the surrounding residues, many which are positively charged, severely restricting its mobility.  Its rigidity suggests a very enthalpically driven association.  Conformational changes cause His11 to rotate, partially aided by hydrogen bonding to His188.  His11 is brought in–line with the phosphate group, and then goes through an SN2 mechanism in which His11 is the nucleophile that attacks the phosphate group.  The 2’ hydroxy group then attacks the phosphate and removes it from His11, thereby creating 2,3-BPG.

References

Further reading

External links 
 
 

EC 5.4.2